Singapore Sling is a 1993 Australian television film about a private eye in Singapore. Directed by Robert Marchand, it led to a series of TV films.

References

External links

Australian television films
1993 television films
1993 films
1990s English-language films
Films directed by Robert Marchand